Siobhan Talbot (born c.1964) is an Irish businesswoman, and the CEO of Glanbia. As such, she is the second woman CEO to head an Irish listed company.

Biography 

Siobhán Talbot was born in Kilmoganny, Kilkenny to a dairy farmer and a school teacher,. She went to University College Dublin where she graduated in 1984 with a Bachelor of Commerce, and a diploma in accounting in 1985.

Talbot worked in Ireland and Australia in PricewaterhouseCoopers before returning to Ireland to work in Waterford Foods. Then she began to rise through the Glanbia group finally becoming the groups Financial director before, in 2013, being appointed CEO of the group. She has worked for the company for over 20 years.

In October 2018, Glanbia acquired the diet brand SlimFast, and Talbot was nominated to join the board of the construction group CRH plc.

In August 2019, Talbot was reappointed group managing director of Glanbia for 3 years with a 20% raise, even though a portion of the group's investors were opposed to this raise.

Awards 

 2015: Award for Outstanding Achievement by the Ireland-US Council
 2018: Business Person of the Month by the magazine Business & Finance

Personal life 

Talbot is married. She has a son (Thomas) and a daughter (Alice). She has survived a cancer diagnosis in 2010.

See also 

 Glanbia
 Gender representation on corporate boards of directors

References

External links 
 Profile on Bloomberg

Living people
Women corporate directors
People from County Kilkenny
Alumni of University College Dublin
Irish chief executives
1964 births